Star Wars is the ninth studio album by American alternative rock group Wilco. It was self-released for free on July 16, 2015, through wilcoworld.net. It is the second Wilco album that was released on their own label dBpm. A CD version of the album was released on August 21 and a vinyl version was released on October 13. The album emerged from Wilco recording sessions at The Loft that also resulted in their 2016 album Schmilco.

Cover art
In an interview with Rolling Stone, Wilco lead singer Jeff Tweedy explained the cover art and album title.

It's kind of an extension of the thought process behind, I don't know, staying in touch with some sort of wild energy as much as possible and some sort of an irreverence. But that painting of that cat hangs in the kitchen at the [Wilco] loft, and every day I'd look at it and go, "You know, that should just be the album cover." Then I started thinking about the phrase "Star Wars" recontextualized against that painting—it was beautiful and jarring. The album has nothing to do with Star Wars. It just makes me feel good. It makes me feel limitless and like there's still possibilities and still surprise in the world, you know?In a November 2018 interview on The Late Show with Stephen Colbert Jeff Tweedy stated that they were prepared to rename and redistribute the album as 'Cease and Desist' as they assumed they would be sued by George Lucas. They allegedly also prepared album artwork featuring  McDonald's Golden Arches upside-down as the W in Wilco.

Accolades

Commercial performance
The album debuted at No. 105 on Billboard 200, and No. 18 on Top Rock Albums for charts dated September 12, 2015, selling 6,000 copies in the first week. 
The album has sold 21,000 copies in the United States as of August 2016.

Track listing
All songs written by Jeff Tweedy, except for "You Satellite" co-written by Tweedy, Glenn Kotche and Nels Cline, "Taste the Ceiling" by Tweedy and Scott McCaughey, and "Magnetized" by Tweedy and Mikael Jorgensen.

Personnel
Wilco
Jeff Tweedy – acoustic guitar, electric guitar, vocals
John Stirratt – bass, acoustic guitar, vocals
Glenn Kotche – drums, percussion
Mikael Jorgensen – keyboards
Nels Cline – electric guitar, loops
Patrick Sansone – electric guitar, keyboards, vocals

Additional musicians
Spencer Tweedy – additional percussion
Scott McCaughey – Mellotron and piano on "Taste the Ceiling"

Charts

References

2015 albums
Albums free for download by copyright owner
Albums produced by Jeff Tweedy
DBpm Records albums
Space rock albums
Wilco albums